Sang Tash (also Romanized as Sang Tāsh) is a village in Lat Leyl Rural District, Otaqvar District, Langarud County, Gilan Province, Iran. At the 2006 census, its population was 22, in 5 families.

References 

Populated places in Langarud County